Ivan Petrović (Serbian Cyrillic: Иван Петровић; born 3 July 1993) is a Serbian professional footballer who plays as a midfielder.

Club career

Radnički Kragujevac
Petrović made his debut with Radnički Kragujevac in the 2011–12 campaign. He played three years for the club, making a total of 55 league appearances and scoring three goals, one each season. On 10 May 2014, Petrović scored a spectacular goal from the middle of the pitch in a 3–3 home draw with Javor Ivanjica.

Partizan
On 4 August 2014, Petrović signed a four-year contract with Partizan and was awarded the number 28 shirt. In April 2017, Petrović terminated a contract with the club.

Brežice
On 23 August 2017, Petrović signed for Slovenian club NK Brežice 1919.

Gorodeya
On 17 March 2018, Petrović signed for Belarus club Gorodeya.

International career
Petrović represented Serbia at the 2012 UEFA Under-19 Championship, where his team was eliminated in the group stage.

Honours
Partizan
Serbian SuperLiga: 2014–15
Serbian Cup: 2015–16

Notes and references

External links
 
 

1993 births
Living people
Sportspeople from Kragujevac
Serbian footballers
Serbia youth international footballers
Association football midfielders
Serbian expatriate footballers
Expatriate footballers in Slovenia
Expatriate footballers in Belarus
Serbian expatriate sportspeople in Slovenia
Serbian expatriate sportspeople in Belarus
FK Radnički 1923 players
FK Partizan players
FC Gorodeya players
NK Krško players
Serbian SuperLiga players
Slovenian Second League players
Belarusian Premier League players
Slovenian PrvaLiga players